was a town located in Shimotsuga District, Tochigi Prefecture, Japan.

As of 2013, the town had an estimated population of 18,152 and a density of  persons per km². The total area was 46.74 km².

On April 5, 2014, Iwafune was merged into the expanded city of Tochigi.

Transportation

Railway
JR East: Ryōmō Line (Iwafune Station)
Tobu Railway: Nikkō Line (Shizuwa Station)

Road
Route 50

References

External links

Dissolved municipalities of Tochigi Prefecture